Eran Shainzinger is an Israeli footballer currently playing at FC Karmiel Safed.

Honours
Israeli Second Division (2):
1998-99, 2001–02
Liga Alef - South (1):
2006-07

See also
Football in Israel
List of football clubs in Israel

References

1976 births
Living people
Israeli footballers
Hapoel Kfar Saba F.C. players
Maccabi Netanya F.C. players
Hapoel Tzafririm Holon F.C. players
Hapoel Maxim Lod F.C. players
Ironi Tiberias F.C. players
Hapoel F.C. Karmiel Safed players
Footballers from Kfar Saba
Place of birth missing (living people)
Association football goalkeepers
Israel international footballers